Web administration may refer to: 

 System administrator
 Web development
 Web design